Michael Dennis (born 1944) is an alpine skier from New Zealand.

In the 1968 Winter Olympics at Grenoble, he came 74th in the Giant Slalom.

References 
 Black Gold by Ron Palenski (2008, 2004 New Zealand Sports Hall of Fame, Dunedin) p. 104

External links 
 
 

Living people
1944 births
New Zealand male alpine skiers
Olympic alpine skiers of New Zealand
Alpine skiers at the 1968 Winter Olympics
Date of birth missing (living people)